James Middleton Riley (February 9, 1851 – December 27, 1913), better known as Doc Middleton, chose the alias David Charles Middleton [but most often called "Doc"], was a famed outlaw and horse thief, whose exploits of stealing perhaps 2,000 horses over a two-year period earned a spot in the Wild West Show.

Criminal career
Middleton stole his first horse at the age of 14.  In 1870 he was convicted of murder and was sentenced to life in prison at the Huntsville Prison. In 1874 he escaped the prison.

He was caught stealing horses in Iowa.  After serving 18 months he moved to Sidney, Nebraska, where he shot and killed a soldier, Pvt. James Keith of the 5th Cavalry Regiment, on January 13, 1877, from nearby Fort Sidney in a bar fight. He was arrested but he escaped as a lynch mob gathered.

He was eventually wanted by Wyoming Stock Growers Association and the Union Pacific Railroad, which offered rewards for his capture.  Army officer William H. H. Llewellyn, seeking to protect pony herds on the Pine Ridge Reservation, was dispatched to capture him.  Llewellyn along with an army from detachment under George Crook lured him to a meeting with a promise of a pardon from the governor.  In a melee, two of Doc's gang were killed and a lawman named Hazen was wounded but Middleton was captured and was taken to Cheyenne, Wyoming, where he was convicted of grand larceny and served a prison sentence from September 18, 1879 and released on June, 18 1883. {At the time of his 1879 arrest it was reported that he had stolen  thirty-five horses from William Irving of Cheyenne in 1877}

In 1884 he and his third bride moved to Gordon, Nebraska, where he operated a saloon and was briefly a deputy sheriff.

In 1897 it was reported he was City Marshal of Edgemont, South Dakota.
 
In 1900 he later moved to Gordon, Nebraska. He had a saloon in both Gordon and Ardmore, South Dakota, and was also the town marshal. In 1913 he moved to Orin Junction, Wyoming, where he opened a saloon.  After getting in a knife fight at the bar he was arrested for dispensing liquor illegally.  While in jail he contracted erysipelas and died.  He is buried in Douglas Park Cemetery in Douglas, Wyoming.

Media produced of his life
A short documentary film aired on Nebraska PBS in 2017 by filmmaker David Higgins (The Aviation Cocktail) called Doc Middleton: The Unwickedest Outlaw. The opening of the short states that Higgins has spent a decade researching the life of the famed Nebraska outlaw. The film uses reenactments and animation, along with interviews from individuals such as Platte County historian Tim Benson, President of the Association of Professional Genealogists Roberta King, Rock County historian Carolyn Hall and Converse County historian Steve Gregersen.

References

External links

Doc Middleton: The Unwickedest Outlaw (short doc) on Vimeo

1851 births
1913 deaths
Outlaws of the American Old West
People from Bastrop, Texas
People from Cheyenne, Wyoming
People from Fall River County, South Dakota
People from Gordon, Nebraska
People from Sidney, Nebraska